The large moth family Gelechiidae contains the following genera:

Tabernillaia
Tahla
Tanycyttara
Taygete
Tecia
Teleiodes
Teleiopsis
Telephata
Telphusa
Tenera
Thaumaturgis
Theisoa
Thiognatha
Thiotricha
Thistricha
Thriophora
Thrypsigenes
Thymosopha
Thyrsostoma
Tila
Tildenia
Tiranimia
Tornodoxa
Tosca
Toxidoceras
Toxotacma
Trachyedra
Tricerophora
Trichembola
Tricyanaula
Tricyphistis
Tritadelpha
Trychnopalpa
Trypanisma
Trypherogenes
Tsochasta
Turcopalpa
Tuta

References

 Natural History Museum Lepidoptera genus database

Gelechiidae
Gelechiid